Kerrville Independent School District is a public school district based in Kerrville, Texas (USA).The superintendent of the District is Dr. Mark Foust. The Texas Education Association (TEA) Accountability Ratings were released on July 31, 2009 and Kerrville Independent School District has been confirmed as a  Recognized District for the third year in a row.

In 2009, the school district was rated "recognized" by the Texas Education Agency.

Schools

Tivy High School
Home of the Fighting Antlers, Tivy High School is located at 3250 Loop 534. The Principal of Tivy is Shelby Balser, and the assistant principals are Christopher Cook, Sean Bloomer, and Leigh Decker.  Candice Michalek serves as Academic Dean.  Athletic Director is David Jones.

Hal Peterson Middle School
Hal Peterson Middle School is located at 3175 Loop 534. The Principal is Tana Althaus and the assistant principals are Kristi Carruthers and Chad Coffey.

B.T. Wilson Sixth Grade School
B.T. Wilson Sixth Grade School is located at 605 Tivy Street. The Principal of B.T. Wilson is Amy Ahrens.  Assistant Principal is Sarah Kraatz.

Tom Daniels Elementary School
Daniels Elementary School is located at 2002 Singing Wind. The Principal is Amy Billeiter and the assistant principal is Dustin Cowart.

Fred H. Tally Elementary School
Fred H. Tally Elementary (colloquially Tally Elementary ) is located at 1840 Goat Creek Pkwy.  The Principal of is Gena Carpenter and the assistant principal is Steven Schwarz.

Nimitz Elementary School
Nimitz Elementary is located at 100 Valley View Dr.  The Principal is Julie Johnson and the assistant principal is Erica Moore.

Starkey Elementary School 
Starkey Elementary School is located at 1030 West Main.  The principal is Jenna Wentrcek and the assistant principal is Aubrey Davila.

Other Schools

 Hill Country High School
 Early Childhood Center (ECC); Head Start, Prekindergarten (PK), Early Childhood Special Education(ECSE), Tivy Child Development Center (TCDC)
 Disciplinary Alternative Education

References

External links
 

School districts in Kerr County, Texas